Ulvibacter antarcticus is a Gram-negative, obligately aerobic and chemoheterotrophic bacterium from the genus of Ulvibacter which has been isolated from Antarctic seawater from the coast.

References

Flavobacteria
Bacteria described in 2007